SJA may refer to:
 St John Ambulance, several organisations
 St. Joseph Academy (St. Augustine, Florida), USA
The Sarah Jane Adventures, UK TV series
 Sports Journalists' Association, UK
 St. Joan of Arc Catholic High School, Maple, Ontario, Canada
 St. Joan of Arc Secondary School, Hong Kong
 St. Johnsbury Academy, Vermont, US
 Saint Jerome's Academy, Bagabag, Nueva Vizcaya, Philippines
 Saint Joseph Academy (disambiguation)
 Staff judge advocate, role in the US Army